The Canadian Major Indoor Soccer League or CMISL was a professional indoor soccer league that began full league play in January 2008. The league's president was Mel Kowalchuk.

As the league has become affiliated with the Professional Arena Soccer League in the United States, the Edmonton Drillers and Saskatoon Accelerators played four soccer games and the Calgary United FC played eight games against the PASL teams in 2009. Edmonton and Saskatoon played two home games and two road games and Calgary played four home games and four road games against PASL teams. In the CMISL portion of the schedule each team will play eight games. This will see Edmonton play six home games and two road games, Saskatoon play two home games and six road games and Calgary play six home games and two road games. The Winnipeg Alliance FC decided to sit out the 2009 season, but rejoined for the 2010 season. In addition, a new expansion club joined the league in 2010 in the form of the Prince George Fury.

The league shrank to just three teams (Calgary, Edmonton, and Winnipeg) in 2011 then just two teams (Calgary and Edmonton) in 2012. The league announced a hiatus for 2013 and had planned return for 2014, but never did.

History
On January 23, 2007, the CMISL issued its first major announcement disclosing its charter franchises in Calgary, Edmonton, Winnipeg, and Saskatoon.

The press release announced that each member franchise would play year round, in both indoor and outdoor professional leagues.

2007 season

For 2007, the CMISL played a "Showcase Season" or an exhibition schedule to create interest and test the markets.

The first match of the "Showcase" was held on March 10, 2007, at the Stampede Corral in Calgary and was played between the Edmonton Drillers and Calgary United FC, while the final match  was played on April 1, 2007, in Winnipeg, at the MTS Centre, between Edmonton and the Winnipeg Alliance FC. In all, each CMISL franchise held a home doubleheader, leading to an uneven number of games between the teams. Edmonton played the most with six games played, as they were the road team for three of the four doubleheaders. The Saskatoon Accelerators on the other hand played only two games, as they did not play a single road game.

2008 season

The CMISL released its 2008 schedule via press release on October 25, 2007, and held an accompanying press conference at Servus Place in St. Albert. The league kicked off its inaugural season on January 19, 2008, with a tournament involving all the teams, hosted by Calgary United FC at the Stampede Corral in Calgary.

A "showcase" match had been scheduled for December 1, 2007, and December 2, 2007, between the Edmonton Drillers and the Prince George FC, but on November 10, 2007, it was reported the series had been rescheduled to April 5, 2008, and April 6, 2008. The game is being played in Prince George at the CN Centre. Four other pre-season exhibition games were scheduled between the Edmonton Drillers and Saskatoon Accelerators. Two of these games will be held in St. Albert at the Servus Place and two will be held in Saskatoon at the Credit Union Centre. All were held between December 28, 2007, and January 6, 2008.

2009 season

As the league has become affiliated with the Professional Arena Soccer League in the United States, the Edmonton Drillers and Saskatoon Accelerators will play four soccer games and the Calgary United FC will play eight games against the PASL teams. Edmonton and Saskatoon will play two home games and two road games and Calgary will play four home games and four road games against PASL teams. In the CMISL portion of the schedule each team will play eight games. This will see Edmonton play six home games and two road games, Saskatoon play two home games and six road games and Calgary play six home games and two road games.

The playoffs will feature the CMISL champion taking part in an interlocking championship with the winners of the PASL and the winner of the Mexican Liga Mexicana de Futbol Rapido. It has not been announced what format the CMISL championship will take.

2010 season

The 2009–08 Canadian Major Indoor Soccer League season sees the reactivation of the Winnipeg Alliance FC and the expansion of the Prince George Fury. Each team will play 4 games against teams from the Professional Arena Soccer League (PASL) in the United States. The season will consist of 12 soccer games total. The Edmonton Drillers, Saskatoon Accelerators, Prince George Fury and Winnipeg Alliance FC will play 6 home games and the Calgary United FC will play 7 due to playing American teams.

2011 season
Calgary United FC won the league championship in the three-team league.

2012 season
With only two teams in the league for the 2012 season, the Edmonton Drillers visited the Calgary United FC for a one-game season and league championship game at the Genesis Wellness Centre on April 21, 2012. Edmonton defeated Calgary 6–3.

2013 season
The league was on hiatus for 2013, planned to return in 2014, but never did. League president Mel Kowalchuk cited health concerns for the failure to recruit additional teams for 2013.

2014 season
The CMISL did not return to play for the 2014 season due to the failure to recruit other teams throughout Canada and with the health concerns of Mel Kowalchuk.

Scheduled Format
All games were played every Saturday and will started exactly at 12:00pm, this allowed the players to free up their schedule.  
January (Pre Season)
February (Regular Season/Indoor)
March (Regular Season/Indoor)
April (Off Season)
May (Regular Season/Outdoor)
June (Regular Season/Outdoor)
July (Post Season, Playoffs/Outdoor)
August (Off Season)
September (Regular Season/Indoor)
October (Regular Season/Indoor)
November (Post Season, Playoffs/Indoor)
December (Off Season)

CMISL teams

Teams

CMISL Champions

Rules
The pitch is a regular sized hockey rink with artificial turf placed on it. Unlike previous years, all goals are worth one point.

Teams consist of six players, including the goalkeeper, on the floor at any one time. The players are changed on the fly, like in hockey. Also like hockey, at times teams will be required to play one or even two players short. These situations, are a result of a player being shown a blue card. A blue card requires the offending player to serve a two- or four-minute penalty depending on the severity of the offense.

A single game is composed of four 15-minute quarters. In the few instances where doubleheaders are scheduled, the games will then be shortened to two 20-minute halves. During exhibition matches if the teams are tied at the end of the regulation time, a penalty shootout will occur to determine the winner.

References

External links
 PASL
 CMISL
 Calgary United FC
 Edmonton Drillers
 Saskatoon Accelerators
 Winnipeg Alliance FC
 Prince George Fury

 
Indoor soccer competitions
Professional Arena Soccer League
Indoor soccer in Canada
Defunct soccer leagues in Canada
Sports leagues established in 2007
2007 establishments in Canada
2012 disestablishments in Canada